Fiery Fork Conservation Area is a public area in Camden County, Missouri, along the Little Niangua River.
It is  large. It is mostly wooded with oak trees and some open space. The park includes a small campground, fishing, hiking, hunting, wildlife viewing, and small-boat access to the Little Niangua River.

References 
 Fiery Fork Conservation Area, Missouri Department of Conservation.

External links 
 https://web.archive.org/web/20090806121726/http://mdc.mo.gov/documents/area_brochures/8103map.pdf - for a pdf file of a map

Conservation Areas of Missouri
Protected areas of Camden County, Missouri